Irving John “Stub” Barron (November 10, 1890 in Gordon, Nebraska – August 18, 1979) was a football player, wrestler, and coach for the University of Iowa.  He was captain of the football team in 1915 and a Big Ten Conference champion in wrestling in 1916.  Barron was inducted into the University of Iowa Athletics Hall of Fame in 1998.

Iowa career

Stub Barron was born in Gordon, Nebraska, but his family moved to Iowa when he was young.  He attended Correctionville High School in Correctionville, Iowa, before attending the University of Iowa from 1912 to 1916.  Barron lettered in football at Iowa from 1913 to 1915, where he played the tackle position.  As a junior in 1914, he broke his arm in a game against Cornell College, which ended his season.  Still, several sources named him an All-Big Ten lineman for the 1914 season.

In his senior season, Barron was named the captain of the 1915 Hawkeye football squad.  He was named a second team All-Western lineman that season.  Barron also wrestled for three seasons at Iowa, winning the Big Ten Conference wrestling title at heavyweight in 1916.

Retirement

Stub Barron attended law school at Iowa for the next two years.  After graduation, he became the head football coach for the Colorado School of Mines in 1918.  Barron led them to an undefeated season in 1918 and the Rocky Mountain Athletic Conference championship.  He later returned to Iowa City and was elected to the Iowa City town council.  Barron also served as Iowa's freshman coach in 1924.  He was elected to the University of Iowa Athletics Hall of Fame in 1998.

References

Iowa Hawkeyes football players
1890 births
1979 deaths
People from Gordon, Nebraska
People from Woodbury County, Iowa